Heroic Deed Among the Ice is a 1928 Soviet silent documentary film. It is also known as Exploit on the Ice and Ice-Breaker Krassin. This film is the first collaboration between Georgi Vasilyev and Sergei Vasilyev.

Subject
Heroic Deed Among the Ice details the mission of the ice-breaker Krasin to rescue the crashed crew of Umberto Nobile's arctic airship Italia. The raw material shot without any plan by cameramen who accompanied Krasin was used by Georgi and Sergei Vasilyev to create a coherent and powerful narrative in the tradition of Soviet montage school. Heroic Deed was released in October 1928 and its success helped Georgi and Sergei Vasilyev to realize their ambition to direct.

All the editing notes by Vasilyev survive and have been published, but the film itself is partially lost.

References 

Bibliography

Jay Leyda. Kino: A History of the Russian and Soviet Film. Princeton University Press, 3 edition, 1983.
Vasilyev brothers. Collected Works. Moscow, 1983. (in Russian)

External links
 

1928 films
Russian aviation films
Soviet black-and-white films
Films directed by Sergei Vasilyev
Soviet silent films
Soviet documentary films
1928 documentary films
Black-and-white documentary films
Russian black-and-white films
Russian documentary films
Russian silent films